Will Hall (born May 10, 1980) is an American football coach and former player.  He is the head coach of The University of Southern Mississippi.  Hall served as the head football coach at the University of West Alabama from 2011 to 2013 and at the University of West Georgia 2014 to 2016. He also served as offensive coordinator for the University of Louisiana at Lafayette in 2017. He grew up in Mississippi and attended the University of North Alabama where he played quarterback from 2002 to 2003. He won the Harlon Hill Trophy in 2003. He began his coaching career in 2004 and held assistant coaching positions at Presbyterian, Henderson State, Southwest Baptist, Arkansas-Monticello and West Alabama. 

Hall was promoted as West Alabama's head football coach on November 17, 2010, after the first retirement of Bobby Wallace. In November 2013, Hall resigned his position at West Alabama and became the head coach at West Georgia. On January 18, 2017, he accepted the offensive coordinator position for the Louisiana Ragin' Cajuns.

Early years
A native of Amory, Mississippi, Hall graduated from Amory High School. Playing for his father Bobby Hall, Will led the 1998 Amory Panthers squad to the MHSAA Class 3A State Championship. After high school, he attended Northwest Mississippi Community College where he played quarterback for the Rangers for the 1999 and 2000 seasons. Both seasons at Northwest, Hall was named a NJCAA Football All-American. In 2000, he set a NJCAA record for total offense in a season with 4,075 total yards (93 rushing and 3,982 passing). Hall also set a NJCAA record when he threw nine touchdown passes in a 69–37 victory over East Mississippi Community College in the 2000 season.

After Northwest Mississippi, Hall attended the University of North Alabama where he lettered as quarterback for the Lions for the 2002 and 2003 seasons. Following the 2003 season he won the Harlon Hill Trophy as the top player in NCAA Division II football. He won the award after leading the Lions to a 13–1 record en route to the semifinals of the NCAA Division II playoffs. For the season, Hall completed 71.8 percent of his passes in throwing for 3,531 yards and 30 touchdowns. He also rushed for 467 yards and five touchdowns.

After participating in the 2004 Cactus Bowl, Hall signed a contract to play for the Tupelo FireAnts of the National Indoor Football League for the 2004 season. Playing once again for his father, who was the head coach for the team, during the fourteen game season he passed for 2,046 yards and 44 touchdowns. Hall also rushed for 422 yards and thirteen touchdowns.

Coaching career

Assistant coaching career
Hall started his coaching career as the quarterbacks coach at Presbyterian College in 2004. From Presbyterian he went to Henderson State University for spring 2005, Southwest Baptist University for fall 2005 and 2006 and the University of Arkansas at Monticello for 2007. In December 2007 Hall was hired to serve as offensive coordinator at the University of West Alabama Under his leadership, the Tigers' offense saw significant improvement, and by 2010 led the Gulf South Conference in pass efficiency with a 155.8 rating. During his tenure West Alabama had consecutive winning seasons for the first time since 1991–92 and to the NCAA second round of the 2009 Division II playoffs.

Head coaching career
On November 17, 2010, Hall was promoted from his position of offensive coordinator to head coach effective January 1, 2011, to replace the retiring Bobby Wallace. In his first season as head coach, Hall led the Tigers to an 8–3 regular season, but lost in the first round of the 2011 Division II playoffs to his alma mater North Alabama. For his efforts, Hall was named the 2011 Gulf South Conference Co-Coach of the Year and was given a contract extension through the 2014 season. In 2012, Hall led the Tigers to an overall record of nine wins and two losses, to the second round of the NCAA Division II playoffs and to the first outright Gulf South championship in the history of the program. In 2013, he led his team to back to back Gulf South conference champion. In 2013, Hall led the Tigers to a share of the GSC conference championship with North Alabama.

On November 22, 2013, Hall was officially introduced as the new head coach for the West Georgia Wolves. He went on in 2015 to with share of GSC title (with North Alabama) and lose to the eventual national champion Northwest Missouri State. After he compiled an overall record of 31 wins and nine losses with the Wolves, Hall resigned his position with West Georgia and took the position of offensive coordinator at Louisiana. At Louisiana he was reunited with Mark Hudspeth who was his head coach when he played quarterback at North Alabama.

University of Southern Mississippi
On December 2, 2020, Hall was officially named the head coach of the Southern Miss Golden Eagles.

Head coaching record

References

External links
 Southern Miss profile

1980 births
Living people
American football quarterbacks
Arkansas–Monticello Boll Weevils football coaches
Henderson State Reddies football coaches
Louisiana Ragin' Cajuns football coaches
North Alabama Lions football players
Northwest Mississippi Rangers football players
Presbyterian Blue Hose football coaches
Southern Miss Golden Eagles football coaches
Southwest Baptist Bearcats football coaches
Tulane Green Wave football coaches
Tupelo FireAnts players
West Alabama Tigers football coaches
West Georgia Wolves football coaches
Amory High School alumni
People from Amory, Mississippi
Coaches of American football from Mississippi
Players of American football from Mississippi